Lavorare con lentezza (internationally released as Working Slowly (Radio Alice)) is a 2004 Italian drama film directed by Guido Chiesa. It is based on actual events involving Radio Alice, a 1970s pirate radio which was politically aligned with the autonomism movement.

It entered the competition at the 61st Venice International Film Festival, in which Tommaso Ramenghi and Marco Luisi won the Marcello Mastroianni Award.

The Wu Ming collective is also credited as co-writers of the screenplay. The film is published under a Creative Commons BY-NC-SA license, and can be downloaded from Archive.org

Plot    
1976, Bologna. Radio Alice is the radio of the movement: fantasy, refusal of wage labor, sexual freedom and cultural provocations. The radio, located in via del Pratello, is kept under control by the police, even if Lieutenant Lippolis is convinced that it is not worth wasting time on what he defines as a bunch of unrealistic, artistic and drug addicted students. A world foreign to law enforcement and "good citizens", but also to the majority of young people from the suburbs.

Like those of Safagna, on the eastern outskirts. Two boys in their twenties, Sgualo and Pelo, can only dream of a way out of the gray and oppressive everyday life. They hang out in the neighborhood bar and sometimes to remedy the chronic lack of money they do some "jobs" for a local fence, Marangon.

This time, however, Marangon offers them something different: dig a tunnel underground in the center. Objective: the Savings Bank in Piazza Minghetti. The two, not without hesitating, accept the risky undertaking.

But working tired, and to liven up the long night hours of "work", the two bring a radio into the tunnel. Against all logic, they find a station: Radio Alice. The "creative flow" of the broadcaster becomes the soundtrack of the pickaxe.

One night Pelo and Sgualo, found unable to continue the excavation due to a downpour, decide to go to the station and come into contact with the world of student activism.

Everything falls with the death of Francesco Lorusso, killed by a shot fired by a carabiniere on 11 March 1977 and with the violent clashes that ensue, clashes that totally involve the two protagonists, one arrested and the other fleeing on the roofs of Bologna to escape the police.

Cast
 Claudia Pandolfi as Marta
 Valerio Mastandrea as Lt. Lippolis
 Marco Luisi as Pelo
 Tommaso Ramenghi as Sgualo
 Valerio Binasco as Marangon
 Massimo Coppola as Umberto 
 Max Mazzotta as Lionello
 Afterhours as Area

See also 
 List of Italian films of 2004

References

External links

  Watch Radio Alice on Archive.org

2004 films
2004 drama films
Italian drama films
2000s Italian-language films
Films set in Emilia-Romagna
Drama films based on actual events
Films directed by Guido Chiesa
Creative Commons-licensed films
2000s Italian films
Fandango (Italian company) films